July 27 - Eastern Orthodox Church calendar - July 29

All fixed commemorations below are celebrated on August 10 by Old Calendar.

For July 28th, Orthodox Churches on the Old Calendar commemorate the Saints listed on July 15.

Saints
 Holy Apostles of the Seventy and Deacons (1st century):
 Prochorus, Nicanor, Timon, and Parmenas.
 Martyr Julian of Dalmatia (c. 138-161)
 Martyr Eustathius the Soldier, of Ancyra (c. 316)
 Martyr Acacius of Miletus (c. 321)
 Martyr Drosis (Drosida, Drosa), by being cast into a golden crucible.  (see also: March 22)
 Martyr Auxentios, of Laodicea in Phrygia.
 Venerable Irene Chrysovolantou of Cappadocia, Abbess of Chrysovalantou (912)
 Venerable Paul of Xeropotamou, on Mount Athos (820 or 996)
 Saint George the Builder, of Iveron, Mt. Athos (1029 or 1033)

Pre-Schism Western saints
 Martyrs Nazarius and Celsus, martyrs in Milan in Italy under Nero (c. 68)  (see also: October 14)
 Saint Victor I, born in North Africa, he was Pope of Rome for ten years from 189-198 (198)
 Saint Peregrinus, a priest near Lyons in France at the time of St Irenaeus and during the persecution under Severus (2nd century)
 Saint Camelian, successor of St Lupus as Bishop of Troyes in France from 478 (c. 525)
 Saints Ursus and Leobatius (Leubais), Brother-Abbots, of Gaul (c. 500)  (see also: July 30)
 Saint Samson of Dol, Bishop of Dol, in Brittany (c. 565)
 Saint Arduinus (Ardwyne), patron-saint of Trepino in the south of Italy (7th century)
 Saint Lucidus of Aquara, a monk of St Peter's near Aquara, in the south of Italy (c. 938)
 Saint Lyutius, a monk at Montecassino who died as a hermit at La Cava Abbey in Italy (c. 1038)

Post-Schism Orthodox saints
 Venerable Moses of the Kiev Caves, Wonderworker (13th-14th centuries)
 Saint Anthony, Bishop of Rostov, Yaroslavl, and Belozersk (1336)
 New Martyr David of Aleppo (1660)
 Saint Pitirim, Bishop of Tambov (1698)
 New Martyr Christodoulos of Kassandreia (1777)

New martyrs and confessors
 New Hieromartyr Nicholas Ponomarev, Deacon (1918)
 New Hieromartyr Basil (Erekaev), Hieromonk of Sarov Monastery (1937)
 Virgin-martyrs Anastasia Kamaeva and Helen Astashkina (1937)
 Martyrs Aretha Yeriomkin, John Lomakin, John Selmanov, John Milioshkin (1937)
 Virgin-martyr Maura Moisieva (1937)
 New Hieromartyr Ignatius (Bazyluk) of Jabłeczna, in Chelm and Podlasie, Poland (1942)  (see also: August 9)

Other commemorations
 Consecration the Temple of the Most Holy Theotokos in the Quarter of Deaconess. 
 Synaxis of the Saints of Tambov (1988)
 Repose of Abbess Daria of Sezenovo Convent (1858)

Icons
 Icon of the Most Holy Theotokos "Directress of Smolensk", brought from Constantinople (1046)
 Icons of the Most Holy Theotokos "Grebensk" (1380), "Kostroma" (1672), and "Umileniye" ("of Tender Feeling") of Diveyevo Convent (1885), before which St. Seraphim reposed.
 Reverence list of an "Smolensk" Icon of the Mother of God:
 "Ustiug" (1290)
 "Vidropusskaya" (15th century)
 "Voronin" (1524)
 "Xristoforov" (16th century) 
 "Suprasl", Poland (16th century)
 "Yugskaya" (1615)
 "Igritsky" (1624)
 "Shuiskaya" (1654-55)
 "Sedmiezersk" (Seven Lakes) (17th century)
 "Sergievsk" (Trinity-St. Sergius Lavra) (1730)

Icon gallery

Notes

References

Sources
 July 28/August 10. Orthodox Calendar (PRAVOSLAVIE.RU).
 August 10 / July 28. HOLY TRINITY RUSSIAN ORTHODOX CHURCH (A parish of the Patriarchate of Moscow).
 July 28. OCA - The Lives of the Saints.
 July 28. The Year of Our Salvation - Holy Transfiguration Monastery, Brookline, Massachusetts. 
 The Autonomous Orthodox Metropolia of Western Europe and the Americas (ROCOR). St. Hilarion Calendar of Saints for the year of our Lord 2004. St. Hilarion Press (Austin, TX). p. 55.
 The Twenty-Eighth Day of the Month of July. Orthodoxy in China.
 July 28. Latin Saints of the Orthodox Patriarchate of Rome.
 The Roman Martyrology. Transl. by the Archbishop of Baltimore. Last Edition, According to the Copy Printed at Rome in 1914. Revised Edition, with the Imprimatur of His Eminence Cardinal Gibbons. Baltimore: John Murphy Company, 1916. pp. 223–224.
 Rev. Richard Stanton. A Menology of England and Wales, or, Brief Memorials of the Ancient British and English Saints Arranged According to the Calendar, Together with the Martyrs of the 16th and 17th Centuries. London: Burns & Oates, 1892. pp. 364–367.

 Greek Sources
 Great Synaxaristes:  28 ΙΟΥΛΙΟΥ. ΜΕΓΑΣ ΣΥΝΑΞΑΡΙΣΤΗΣ.
  Συναξαριστής. 28 Ιουλίου. ECCLESIA.GR. (H ΕΚΚΛΗΣΙΑ ΤΗΣ ΕΛΛΑΔΟΣ). 
  28/07/. Ορθόδοξος Συναξαριστής.

 Russian Sources
  10 августа (28 июля). Православная Энциклопедия под редакцией Патриарха Московского и всея Руси Кирилла (электронная версия). (Orthodox Encyclopedia - Pravenc.ru).
  28 июля по старому стилю / 10 августа по новому стилю. СПЖ "Союз православных журналистов". .

July in the Eastern Orthodox calendar